Carrot River Valley is a provincial electoral district for the Legislative Assembly of Saskatchewan, Canada. Located in the east central area of Saskatchewan, this constituency was created by The Representation Act, 1994 (Saskatchewan) out of the former district of Kelsey-Tisdale and part of the riding of Nipawin. The Carrot River flows through the riding.

The riding was last contested in the 2020 general election, when incumbent Saskatchewan Party MLA Fred Bradshaw was re-elected.

The largest population centers in the constituency are Nipawin (pop. 4,275), Tisdale (pop. 3,063), Hudson Bay (pop. 1,783), and Carrot River (pop. 1,017). Smaller communities in the riding include the villages of Codette, Zenon Park, Aylsham, Mistatim, and Crooked River; and the town of Arborfield.

History 
The riding was first contested in the 1995 general election, when it returned NDP candidate Andy Renaud. After the 1999 general election, the riding returned only Saskatchewan Party members until the present day.

Members of the Legislative Assembly

This riding has elected the following Members of the Legislative Assembly:

Election results

2020 Saskatchewan general election

2016 Saskatchewan general election

2011 Saskatchewan general election

2007 Saskatchewan general election

2003 Saskatchewan general election

2003 Carrot River Valley by-election

1999 Saskatchewan general election

1995 Saskatchewan general election

See also
Kelsey (Saskatchewan provincial electoral district) (1952–1971)
Kelsey-Tisdale (1971–1995)

References

External links 
Website of the Legislative Assembly of Saskatchewan
Saskatchewan Archives Board – Saskatchewan Election Results By Electoral District

Saskatchewan provincial electoral districts